Hotel Marriott may refer to hotels owned by Marriott International including:
Tbilisi Marriott Hotel
Centrum LIM, Warsaw Marriott Hotel